Fabián Basabe (born March 30, 1978) is an American businessman and politician who gained notoriety as a reality television star. He currently serves as a member of the Florida House of Representatives for the 106th district. He assumed office on November 8, 2022.  He serves on the Education and Employment committee.

Early life and education 
Basabe was born in New York City to an American mother and an Ecuadorian father. In 1987, Basabe's family moved to Miami, where his parents operated a hotel. He graduated from Cheshire Academy. He studied international relations at Pepperdine University before moving to Manhattan, where he became a socialite and television personality.

Career 
Prior to entering politics, Basabe appeared in the reality television series Filthy Rich: Cattle Drive and Faking It. He was elected to the Florida House of Representatives in November 2022. Basabe was previously a candidate for the Miami Beach City Commission. He describes himself as fiscally conservative and socially liberal.

References 

Living people
Republican Party members of the Florida House of Representatives
People from Miami Beach, Florida
Hispanic and Latino American state legislators in Florida
American politicians of Ecuadorian descent
Cheshire Academy alumni
1978 births
21st-century American politicians